Brad Pearce (born March 21, 1966) is a former tennis player from the United States, who turned professional in 1986. He won four doubles titles during his career. The right-hander reached his highest singles ATP ranking on October 8, 1990, when he became the World No. 71.

Pearce was inducted into the Intercollegiate Tennis Association (ITA) Hall of Fame.

Career

1987
Pearce started off his new season playing doubles, reaching four finals.  Three of those were on the Grand Prix tennis circuit.  He won his first final in January at the Auckland, with partner Kelly Jones.  En route he defeated players such as Milan Šrejber and Mark Woodforde to win the title.  His year continued on a high note, making it to the quarter finals of the Ebel U.S. Pro Indoor and the Lorraine Open and the semi finals of the Japan Open Tennis Championships.  Later he reached the finals at the OTB Open with partner Jim Pugh, losing to Gary Donnelly and Gary Muller 6–7, 2–6.  A month later he made it to the final in New Haven with partner Gilad Bloom of Israel as the #1 seed, losing to the #2 seed Glenn Layendecker and Glenn Michibata 6–3, 4–6, 2–6.

1988

1989

1990
The highlight of Pearce's single career was his appearance in the quarter-finals of the Wimbledon Championship.  Pearce was an unseeded player, and one of three Americans in the quarter-finals (Brad Gilbert and Kevin Curren being the others).  En route he beat Ronnie Båthman (6–3, 3–6, 6–2, 6–3), Shuzo Matsuoka (7–6, 7–5, 6–3), Milan Šrejber (6–3, 6–3, 6–1), and Mark Woodforde (6–4, 6–4, 6–4) to face Ivan Lendl, the #1 seed of the tournament, where he lost (4–6, 4–6, 7–5, 4–6).

1991

Personal life
Pearce now works as an employee of Brigham Young University in the athletic department.  He is the head coach of the BYU men's tennis team, and coached several players who have reached the top 800's in ATP rankings.

Career finals

Doubles (4 titles – 8 runner-ups)

References

External links
 
 
 Profile on BYU Athletics

1966 births
Living people
American male tennis players
BYU Cougars men's tennis coaches
Sportspeople from Provo, Utah
Tennis people from Utah
UCLA Bruins men's tennis players
Goodwill Games medalists in tennis
Competitors at the 1986 Goodwill Games
American tennis coaches